Tilbe is a feminine Turkish given name of Persian and ultimate Arabic origin which is also used as a surname. In Turkish, Tilbe means "the wise, the reflective" or even "the idol".

People

Given name
 Tilbe Saran (born 1961), Turkish actress
 Tilbe Şenyürek (born 1995), Turkish female basketball player

Surname
 Yıldız Tilbe (born 1966), Turkish singer of Kurdish-Zaza descent

Turkish feminine given names
Turkish-language surnames